Pretty Creek is a stream in Hickman County, Tennessee in the United States.

According to legend, Pretty Creek was named after the beautiful daughters of a minister who lived on the creek.

See also
List of rivers of Tennessee

References

Rivers of Hickman County, Tennessee
Rivers of Tennessee